Picea schrenkiana, Schrenk's spruce, or Asian spruce, is a spruce native to the Tian Shan mountains of central Asia in western China (Xinjiang), Kazakhstan, and Kyrgyzstan. It grows at altitudes of 1,200–3,500 metres, usually in pure forests, sometimes mixed with the Tien Shan variety of Siberian fir (Abies sibirica var. semenovii). Its name was given in honour of Alexander von Schrenk (1816–1876).

Description

It has a narrow conical crown with level branches and sometimes pendulous branchlets. The shoots are pale buff-brown, and glabrous (hairless). The leaves are needle-like, 1.5–3.5 cm long, rhombic in cross-section, dark green with inconspicuous stomatal lines.

The cones are cylindrical–conic, 6–12 cm long and 2 cm broad, purple when young, maturing dark brown and opening to 2.5–3.5 cm broad 5–7 months after pollination; the scales are moderately stiff and smoothly rounded.

Subspecies
There are two subspecies:
Picea schrenkiana subsp. schrenkiana. Eastern Tian Shan, in Kazakhstan and Xinjiang. Leaves longer, 2–3.5 cm long.
Picea schrenkiana subsp. tianshanica (Rupr.) Bykov. Western Tian Shan, in Kyrgyzstan. Leaves shorter, 1.5–2.5 cm long.

It is closely related to, and in many respects intermediate between Morinda spruce (Picea smithiana) from further south in the Himalaya, and Siberian spruce (Picea obovata) further north in Siberia.

Uses
Schrenk's spruce is an important tree in central Asia for timber and paper production, where few other large trees exist. Its slower growth compared to Norway Spruce reduces its importance outside of its native range.

Cultivation
Picea schrenkiana is grown as an ornamental tree in large gardens and public parks in Europe.

References

Further reading
Farjon, A. (1990). Pinaceae. Drawings and Descriptions of the Genera. Koelz Scientific, .

External links

Flora of China: Picea schrenkiana

schrenkiana
Flora of Central Asia
Flora of Kazakhstan
National symbols of Kazakhstan
Flora of Kyrgyzstan
Flora of Xinjiang
Trees of Asia
Tian Shan
Plants described in 1842
Least concern plants
Least concern biota of Asia
Garden plants of Asia
Ornamental trees